K2-21b, also known as EPIC 206011691 b is an exoplanet orbiting K2-21, a red dwarf 273.5 light-years away from Earth, with a period of 9.3 days. It has a density of 2.7g/cm3, indicating that it is not a rocky planet. The margin of error is however quite large, with a possible density between 1.1 and 6.4 g/cm3. Due to this error margin, the true nature of its composition is uncertain.

References

Exoplanets discovered in 2015
Transiting exoplanets
2
Aquarius (constellation)